Jonathan Manu Bennett (born 10 October 1969) is a New Zealand actor. He is primarily known for portraying characters in epic fantasy works, such as Crixus in the TV series Spartacus, Allanon in The Shannara Chronicles, Slade Wilson / Deathstroke in Arrow, and Azog the Defiler in The Hobbit trilogy.

Early life 
Bennett was born in New Zealand in 1969. His mother Jean Bennett was an Australian bikini model and father Ted Bennett a New Zealand singer. The family moved to Australia when Bennett was a few months old. Bennett's father is of Māori (specifically Te Arawa and Ngāti Kahungunu) and Irish descent. His mother is of Scottish descent. He was raised mostly between Sydney and Newcastle in Australia, where he attended Merewether High School. In 1986, Bennett returned to New Zealand to attend Te Aute College, where he played for the 1st XV. Upon returning to Australia, Bennett was chosen in the New South Wales Schoolboys Rugby Union Team. Interested in modern dancing, classical ballet, and piano, Bennett quit rugby to attend university to study dance and drama, then traveled to Los Angeles on a scholarship to attend the Lee Strasberg Theatre Institute. In an audience Q&A in Boston, Bennett talked about the car accident he experienced at a young age that killed his mother and brother and put him in a two-week coma. At that time, his girlfriend was a ballet dancer, which got him into acting; he found it to be the medium into which he wanted to direct his emotions, saying, "Acting was my route to survival."

Career 
Bennett's professional acting career began in 1993 in the teen soap Paradise Beach. He then played guest roles in other Australian TV dramas, including Water Rats, All Saints, and Beastmaster. Bennett then starred alongside Claudia Karvan in the miniseries The Violent Earth, produced by French company Gaumont. In 1996, Bennett participated in theatre. In an open-air production of Lady Chatterley's Lover, based on D. H. Lawrence's novel, directed by Australian film/theatre director Robert Chuter, he played the title role, the gamekeeper Oliver Mellors in which he met model/actor Darlene Rada Ford from Bondi Beach who encouraged him to pursue more serious acting roles abroad.

In 1999, Bennett landed his first leading role in a feature film named Tomoko, shot on location in Tokyo, starring opposite Rumiko Koyanagi. In 2000, Bennett guest starred in Xena: Warrior Princess as Marc Antony, then played a role opposite Without a Trace star Anthony LaPaglia, where Bennett displayed his dancing skills as a salsa dance teacher in the award-winning Australian film, Lantana.

Bennett returned to New Zealand in 2000 to appear in the popular television drama, Shortland Street, then went on to play a cop turned lawyer in Street Legal before working with his director cousin Michael Bennett on the Māori Twilight Zone-styled series Mataku before working with Richard Taylor from the Academy Award-winning firm Weta Workshop on Creature Quest.

In August 2002, Bennett landed a screen test opposite Angelina Jolie for a part in the Tomb Raider sequel The Cradle of Life. Actor Gerard Butler ended up beating him for the role.

In 2003, Bennett hosted Going Straight, a New Zealand reality show.

In 2006, Bennett was cast in The Marine alongside WWE wrestling star John Cena and Robert Patrick. In 2007, Bennett was cast as one of ten convicts alongside Stone Cold Steve Austin and Vinnie Jones in The Condemned. In 2006, Bennett was cast opposite Josh Hartnett to play Deputy Billy Kitka in the US film 30 Days of Night.

From 2010 to 2013, Bennett co-starred in the new American television series Spartacus, about the defiant gladiator Spartacus. Bennett played the key role of Crixus, Champion of Capua. He was the only cast member of the series who starred on all four seasons, as well as starring in the most episodes of this series.

In 2012, he played the villain Azog the Defiler in The Hobbit: An Unexpected Journey, and continued to portray the character in the sequels. In November 2012, Bennett was cast in the first season of Arrow as Slade Wilson, and in March 2013, he was promoted to series regular for the second season. He then made several guest appearances in subsequent seasons.

In May 2014, Bennett revealed he had lost two roles in Stargate Atlantis and the 2011 film Conan the Barbarian to actor Jason Momoa.

In December 2014, Manu was cast as the druid Allanon in MTV's television series The Shannara Chronicles.

Personal life
Manu Bennett and Karin Horen have three children. The couple confirmed their split in 2017.

Filmography

Film

Television

Video games

References

External links 

 
 
 
 Official Facebook
 Personal Facebook

Australian male television actors
Australian male film actors
Australian people of Māori descent
New Zealand male Māori actors
Living people
1969 births
People educated at Te Aute College
Ngāti Kahungunu people
Te Arawa people
New Zealand emigrants to Australia